The 2005 Copa del Rey Juvenil was the 55th staging of the tournament. The competition began on May 15, 2005 and ended on June 26, 2005 with the final.

First round

|}

Quarterfinals

|}

Semifinals

|}

Final

Copa del Rey Juvenil de Fútbol
Juvenil